Galen was an Ancient Roman physician of Greek origin.

Galen may also refer to:

Places 
 Galen, Montana, United States, an unincorporated community
 Galen, New York, United States, a town
 Galen Peak, Palmer Archipelago, Antarctica
 Galen (crater), a lunar impact crater

Schools 
 Galen Catholic College, a college in Wangaratta, Victoria, Australia
 Galen University, a university in San Ignacio, Belize
 Galen College of Nursing, a private nursing school in multiple locations in the United States

People 
 Galen (given name)
 Galen (surname)
 Vasily Blyukher (1889–1938), Soviet military commander who used the pseudonym "Galen" while in China
 Phillip Galen, pen name of Ernst Philipp Karl Lange (1813–1899), German novelist

Other uses
 Galen Center, an athletic facility in California, United States
 Galen Partners, an American healthcare-focused equity investment firm
 Galen Institute, a health policy think tank in Alexandria, Virginia
 Galen, a fictitious town in the novel The Land of Laughs by Jonathan Carroll 
 Galen, a technomage character in the TV series Crusade
 Starkiller, also known as Galen Marek, a fictional character from the Star Wars expanded universe
 Galen Walton Erso, a fictional character from the 2016 Star Wars film Rogue One
 Galen Framework, a software testing framework

See also 
 OpenGALEN, a provider of an open source medical terminology
 Von Galen family
 Galan (disambiguation)
 Galena (disambiguation)
 Galien (disambiguation)
 Gehlen (disambiguation)
 Gaylon, a list of people with the given name